Riley Jones is an English actor, known for his role as  DC Mark Edwards on the ITV crime drama television series Vera (2011–present).

Filmography

References

External links
 
 

English stage actors
English television actors
Living people
Year of birth missing (living people)